Coreglia Ligure is a comune (municipality) in the Metropolitan City of Genoa in the Italian region Liguria, located about  east of Genoa.

Coreglia Ligure borders the following municipalities: Cicagna, Orero, Rapallo, San Colombano Certénoli, Zoagli.

Twin towns — sister cities
Coreglia Ligure is twinned with:

  Coreglia Antelminelli, Italy, since 2005

References

Cities and towns in Liguria